International judicial institutions can be divided into courts, arbitral tribunals and quasi-judicial institutions. Courts are permanent bodies, with near the same composition for each case. Arbitral tribunals, by contrast, are constituted anew for each case. Both courts and arbitral tribunals can make binding decisions. Quasi-judicial institutions, by contrast, make rulings on cases, but these rulings are not in themselves legally binding; the main example is the individual complaints mechanisms available under the various UN human rights treaties.

Institutions can also be divided into global and regional institutions.

The listing below incorporates both currently existing institutions, defunct institutions that no longer exist, institutions which never came into existence due to non-ratification of their constitutive instruments, and institutions which do not yet exist, but for which constitutive instruments have been signed. It does not include mere proposed institutions for which no instrument was ever signed.

International courts
 International Court of Justice
 International Tribunal for the Law of the Sea
 International Criminal Tribunal for the Former Yugoslavia
 International Criminal Tribunal for Rwanda
 International Criminal Court
 International Military Tribunal (Defunct)
 International Military Tribunal for the Far East (Defunct)
 International Prize Court (Never established)
 Permanent Court of International Justice (Defunct.  Replaced by the International Court of Justice)

International arbitral tribunals
 Permanent Court of Arbitration
 WTO Appellate Body
 WTO Dispute Settlement Panels
 NAFTA Dispute Settlement Panels
 International Centre for the Settlement of Investment Disputes
 Court of Arbitration for Sport
 OSCE Court of Conciliation and Arbitration

Quasi-judicial international institutions

 Human Rights Committee
 Committee on the Elimination of Racial Discrimination
 Committee on the Elimination of Discrimination Against Women
 Committee on Economic, Social and Cultural Rights
 Committee on the Rights of the Child
 Committee Against Torture
 Committee on Migrant Workers
Committee on the Rights of Persons with Disabilities

African regional judicial institutions
 African Court on Human and Peoples' Rights
 Court of Justice of the African Union (planned)
 Court of Justice of the Common Market for Eastern and Southern Africa
 Community Court of Justice of the Economic Community of West African States
 East African Court of Justice
 Southern African Development Community Tribunal

Regional judicial institutions of the Americas
 Inter-American Court of Human Rights
 Central American Court of Justice
 Court of Justice of the Andean Community
 Caribbean Court of Justice
 Eastern Caribbean Supreme Court

European regional judicial institutions
 European Court of Justice
 European General Court
 European Court of Human Rights
 Court of Justice of the European Free Trade Agreement States
 Benelux Court of Justice
 Economic Court of the Commonwealth of Independent States
 European Nuclear Energy Tribunal (dormant)
 Western European Union Tribunal (defunct)
 European Tribunal in Matters of State Immunity (dormant)

References 

Judicial institutions
Judicial institutions